Jean Chalette (27 December 1581 (baptised) – 2 October 1643) was a French miniature and portrait painter.

Chalette was born in Troyes, where he at first practised his art. In 1581 he was summoned to Toulouse to decorate the Hôtel-de-Ville, and there gained so much renown that he settled in that city, where he died in 1643.

References

 

1581 births
1643 deaths
People from Troyes
Artists from Toulouse
16th-century French painters
French male painters
17th-century French painters
Portrait miniaturists